Courtney Jason Alexander (born April 27, 1977) is an American former professional basketball player who is currently an assistant coach of the College Park Skyhawks of the NBA G League.

Professional career
After playing high school basketball at Masuk High School in Monroe, Connecticut Alexander moved to Durham, North Carolina to play for C. E. Jordan High School to finish his high school career. A shooting guard, he played college basketball at University of Virginia and Fresno State, and he led the nation in scoring in the 1999–2000 season at Fresno State.

He was selected by the Orlando Magic with the 13th overall pick in the 2000 NBA draft; his rights were traded to the Dallas Mavericks on the same day. He played for the Mavericks before being traded during his rookie season to the Washington Wizards where he played until 2002. He was named to the All-Rookie 2nd Team. He was then traded in the offseason to the New Orleans Hornets.  A highlight of his career was a 33-point effort for the Wizards against the Toronto Raptors on April 18, 2001 when Richard Hamilton was out with injuries. He later signed with the Sacramento Kings but was released before ever playing a game for them. On October 8, 2006, Alexander was signed by the Denver Nuggets after being out of the league for three seasons, but was waived on October 15.

Because of his 3-year hiatus and being waived in October 2006 by the Nuggets before ever playing a game for them, Alexander's final NBA game was actually played on May 2nd, 2003 in Game 6 of the Eastern Conference First Round against the Philadelphia 76ers. In that game, he only recorded 2 points as the Hornets would lose the series 4 - 2 and being eliminated from the playoffs.

NBA career statistics

Regular season

|-
|align=left|2000–01
|align=left|Dallas
|38||6||12.4||.348||.300||.733||1.7||.6||.4||.1||4.2
|-
|align=left|2000–01
|align=left|Washington
|27||18||33.7||.448||.389||.857||3.0||1.5||1.1||.1||17.0
|-
|align=left|2001–02
|align=left|Washington
|56||28||23.7||.470||.278||.810||2.6||1.5||.6||.1||9.8
|-
|align=left|2002–03
|align=left|New Orleans 
|66||7||20.6||.382||.333||.808||1.8||1.2||.5||.1||7.9
|-class=sortbottom
|style="text-align:center;" colspan=2|Career
|187||59||21.7||.422||.339||.813||2.2||1.2||.6||.1||9.0
|}

Playoffs

|-
|align=left|2003
|align=left|New Orleans
|5||0||7.8||.438||1.000||.750||.8||.2||.4||.0||3.6
|-class=sortbottom
|style="text-align:center;" colspan=2|Career
|5||0||7.8||.438||1.000||.750||.8||.2||.4||.0||3.6
|}

References

External links

NBA.com Profile
NBA stats @ basketballreference.com

1977 births
Living people
All-American college men's basketball players
American men's basketball players
Basketball players from Connecticut
Dallas Mavericks players
Fresno State Bulldogs men's basketball players
New Orleans Hornets players
Orlando Magic draft picks
Parade High School All-Americans (boys' basketball)
Shooting guards
Sportspeople from Bridgeport, Connecticut
Virginia Cavaliers men's basketball players
Washington Wizards players